Haploclastus psychedelicus, synonym Thrigmopoeus psychedelicus, is a theraphosid spider. It is native to India.

Etymology
The specific name psychedelicus refers to the word "psychedelia", referring to the adult's bright blue carapace and legs.

Characteristics
H. psychedelicus has a blue metallic tinge to the cephalothorax and legs, and has scattered maxillary setae on the prolateral face of the maxillae. In other species it is "C" shaped.

References

Theraphosidae
Spiders of the Indian subcontinent
Spiders described in 2014